Bursa quirihorai is a species of sea snail, a marine gastropod mollusk in the family Bursidae, the frog shells.

Description
This species was named after Quirino Hora from Panglao, Bohol, whose family owns the extensive Nova Shell Museum.

References

Bursidae
Gastropods described in 1987